Lithocarpus andersonii is a tree in the beech family Fagaceae. It is named for former Borneo Forest Officer James A. R. Anderson.

Description
The brownish bark is smooth.

Distribution and habitat
Lithocarpus andersonii is endemic to Borneo. Its habitat is lowland peat swamp and kerangas forests.

References

andersonii
Endemic flora of Borneo
Trees of Borneo
Plants described in 1970